DWKN (91.3 FM), broadcasting as One Radio 91.3 News FM, is a radio station owned and operated by Capricom Production & Management. Its studio is located at WCC Bldg., A. A. Berces St. cor. Sta. Cruz St., Brgy. Basud, Tabaco.

References

Radio stations in Albay
Radio stations established in 2005